Emery Worldwide Airlines Flight 17 was a regularly scheduled domestic cargo flight, flying from Reno to Dayton with an intermediate stopover at Rancho Cordova. On February 16, 2000, the DC-8 crashed onto an automobile salvage yard shortly after taking off from Sacramento Mather Airport, resulting in the deaths of all three crew members on board. The crew reported control problems during takeoff and attempted unsuccessfully to return to Mather airport.

Aircraft and crew

The aircraft involved in the accident was a 1968-built Douglas DC-8-71, registration N8079U.  Operated by United Airlines (1968–1990) and Líneas Aéreas Paraguayas (1990–1994), later modified for service as a freighter before being sold. In March 1994 N8079U was operated by Emery Worldwide and had accumulated about 84,447 flight hours in 33,395 flight cycles. In July 1983, the Pratt & Whitney JT3D engines were replaced with CFM International CFM56 engines to upgrade the aircraft from a 60-series to a 70-series aircraft.

The flight crew consisted of Captain Kevin Stables (43), who had logged 13,329 flight hours and 2,128 hours in type; First Officer George Land (35), who had logged 4,511 flight hours and 2,080 in type; and Flight Engineer Russell Hicks (38), who had logged 9,775 flight hours and 675 in type.

Accident
The flight was a regular domestic cargo flight from Reno–Tahoe International Airport (RNO) to James M. Cox Dayton International Airport (DAY) with an intermediate stopover at Sacramento Mather Airport in Rancho Cordova, California. The flight was operated by Emery Worldwide - then a major cargo airline in the U.S. - using a McDonnell Douglas DC-8-71F with the three crew members on board.

After completing the taxi checklist, the crew members initiated the before-take-off checklist at around 19:47 local time. They then advised traffic at the airport, which had not yet reopened its control tower, that they were going to initiate the take-off from runway 22L. The crew members were later cleared for take-off. The crew applied a continuous nose-down input during the take-off roll.

As the aircraft reached its V1 speed, the captain called "rotate". The pitch then increased from 0.2 to 5.3°. Data from the control column indicated the crew at the time was still applying forward movement to the control column (nose-down input), but somehow the nose rose upward from 14.5 to 17.4° as the crew added more force to the control column. The aircraft reached V2 and began to lift off.

Immediately after the aircraft lifted off from the runway, the aircraft entered a left turn and the first officer quickly stated that Flight 17 would like to return to Sacramento. The engine's speed began to decrease and the stick shaker activated for the first time. The captain declared an emergency on Flight 17, believing a load shift had occurred. The aircraft began to move erratically, and the elevator deflection and the bank angle began to decrease and increase, respectively. The aircraft began to descend.

The captain repeated the emergency declaration as the engine's speed began to increase. At the time, the aircraft was descending with a steepening bank of 11°. The crew then added power and the aircraft began to climb again. As the aircraft continued to climb, the bank angle began to increase to the left. The captain then contacted Mather tower, stating that Flight 17 "has an extreme CG problem."

The aircraft then continued to fly in a northwesterly heading. The crew was trying to stabilize the aircraft as it began to sway to the left and to the right. The ground proximity warning system  then started to sound. At 19:51, the aircraft's left wing contacted a concrete and steel support column for an overhang attached to a two-story building, located adjacent to the southeast edge of the salvage yard. The DC-8 then crashed onto the salvage yard, striking hundreds of cars, before the fuel tanks ruptured and exploded. All three crew members on board were killed.

Investigation
An investigation by the National Transportation Safety Board (NTSB) revealed that during the aircraft's rotation, a control rod to the right elevator control tab detached, causing a loss of pitch control. The NTSB further found that an incorrect maintenance procedure, which was implemented by Emery Worldwide Airlines, introduced an incorrect torque-loading on the bolts that were supposed to connect the control rod. The NTSB released its final report in 2003, three years after the accident. The report stated that the crash of Flight 17 was caused by the detachment of the right elevator control tab. The disconnection was caused by the failure to properly secure and inspect the attachment bolt. 

The NTSB then added: "The safety issues discussed in this report include DC-8 elevator position indicator installation and usage, adequacy of DC-8 maintenance work cards (required inspection items), and DC-8 elevator control tab design. Safety recommendations are addressed to the Federal Aviation Administration".

Fifteen recommendations were issued by the NTSB. One of these was to evaluate every DC-8 on U.S. soil to prevent further crashes that could be caused by the disconnection of the right elevator tab. The Federal Aviation Administration subsequently found more than 100 maintenance violations by the airline, including one that caused another accident on April 26, 2001. Emery Worldwide  grounded its entire fleet permanently on August 13, 2001.

CVR transcript 
Expletives are indicated by a "#" and a pause is indicated by "...". Some portions (such as when the speaker is unidentified) have been omitted.

Dramatization
The crash of Emery Worldwide Airlines Flight 17 was featured in the first episode of the 18th season in the Canadian documentary show Mayday, also known as Air Disasters in the United States and as Air Crash Investigation in Europe and the rest of the world. The episode was titled "Nuts and Bolts".

See also
 Trans International Airlines Flight 863 – another accident involving a DC-8 freighter and problems with the right elevator

References

External links 

 
Cockpit Voice Recorder transcript and accident summary

Aviation accidents and incidents in California
Aviation accidents and incidents in the United States in 2000
Aviation accidents and incidents in 2000
2000 in California
February 2000 events in the United States
Accidents and incidents involving the Douglas DC-8
Airliner accidents and incidents caused by mechanical failure
Accidents and incidents involving cargo aircraft